Ulf Åkerblom (born 3 May 1957) is a Swedish bobsledder. He competed in the four man event at the 1984 Winter Olympics.

References

External links
 

1957 births
Living people
Swedish male bobsledders
Olympic bobsledders of Sweden
Bobsledders at the 1984 Winter Olympics
People from Söderhamn
Sportspeople from Gävleborg County
20th-century Swedish people